Pedernales Canton is a canton of Ecuador, located in the Manabí Province. Its capital is the town of Pedernales. Its population at the 2001 census was 46,876.

Demographics
Ethnic groups as of the Ecuadorian census of 2010:
White 82.0%
Afro-Ecuadorian 7.9%
Montubio 5.9%
Mestizo 3.6%
Indigenous 0.3%
Other 0.2%

References

Cantons of Manabí Province